Volume is a 2012 short film directed by Mahalia Belo, written by Anna Ingeborg Topsøe, and starring Joe Cole and Anna Brewster. It won the Best British Short film at the 2012 Moët British Independent Film Awards and the Grand Jury Prize for Best Film at San Francisco Shorts 2013. It was also part of the official selection at the 2013 Sundance Film Festival while also appearing at numerous other film festival. Volume was director Mahalia Belo's graduation short at the  National Film and Television School (NTFS).

Cast 
 Joe Cole as Sam
 Anna Brewster as Georgina
 Jamie Sives as Nik
 Susan Vidler as Angie
 Hilary Tones as Julie
 David Acton as Richard
 Jake Davies as Johnny
 Melanie Jessop as Claire

References

External links 

2012 short films